Xiangyang Township is a township under the administration of Jiayin County, Heilongjiang, China. , it has 11 villages under its administration.

References 

Township-level divisions of Heilongjiang
Jiayin County